Khyber Pakhtunkhwa is located in the north-west region of Pakistan. It is known as the tourist hotspot for adventurers and explorers. The province has a varied landscape ranging from rugged mountains, valleys, hills and dense agricultural farms. The region is well known for its ancestral roots. There are a number of Buddhist archaeological sites from the Gandhara civilisation such as Takht Bhai and Pushkalavati. There are a number of other Buddhist and Hindu archaeological sites including Bala Hisar Fort, Butkara Stupa, Kanishka stupa, Chakdara, Panjkora Valley and Sehri Bahlol.

Peshawar is the provincial capital of Khyber Pakhtunkhwa. The city is home to a number of sites including Bala Hisar Fort, Peshawar Museum, archaeological site of Gor Khuttree, Mohabbat Khan Mosque, old city of Sethi Mohallah, Jamrud Fort, the Sphola Stupa and the most famous market of Qissa Khawani. The city of Dera Ismail Khan is known to be the entrance into the province from Punjab and Balochistan. The city is famous for its Hindu ruins at Kafir Kot. The Buddhist ruins at Shahbaz Garhi are also famous in the city of Mardan. Heading towards North, the region of Swat valley comes, which is a lush green paradise for the travelers, full of charming and picturesque spots like Marghazar, Miandam, Malam Jabba, Gabina Jabba, Jarogo Waterfall and Kalam sub valley are worth seen areas.

One of the most important cities in the province is Mansehra. The city is a major stop for tourists setting out to the Northern Areas and Azad Kashmir. The city is connected by the famous Karakoram Highway which ends up in China. Along the route there are several stops including the Kaghan Valley, Balakot, Naran, Shogran, Lake Saiful Mulook and Babusar Top. There are also several other sites within the province which attract a large number of tourist every year including Ayubia, Batkhela, Chakdara, Saidu Sharif, Kalam Valley and Hindu Kush mountain range in Chitral.

There are also several mountain passes that run through the province. One of the most famous is the Khyber Pass which links Afghanistan with Pakistan. The trade route sees a large number of trucks and lorries importing and exporting goods in and out of the region. The Babusar Pass is another mountain pass connecting the Thak Nala with Chilas on the Karakorum Highway. The Lowari Pass is another pass which connects Chitral with Dir via the Lowari Tunnel. The highest mountain pass in Pakistan is Shandur Pass which connects Chitral to Gilgit and is known as the Roof of the World. The pass is the center of three mountain ranges – Hindukush, Pamir and Karakoram.

Places of interest

Valleys
Chitral Valley
Kaghan Valley
Kalam Valley
Kumrat Valley
Swat Valley

Lakes
The following are the accessible lakes ;
 Ansoo Lake
 Daral Lake
 Dudipatsar
 Kundol Lake
 Mahodand Lake
 Jabba Zomalu Lake
 Katora Lake
 Lake Saiful Muluk
 Lulusar
 Pyala Lake

National Parks
 Broghil Valley National Park
 Chitral National Park
 Lulusar-Dudipatsar National Park
 Saiful Muluk National Park
 Sheikh Buddin National Park

Historic Places
Bala Hissar Fort
Chitral Fort
Mahabat Khan Mosque
Kafir Kot
Khyber Pass
Takht-i-Bahi

Gallery

See also
 Tourism in Pakistan
 Tourism in Punjab, Pakistan
 Tourism in Sindh
 Tourism in Balochistan, Pakistan
 Tourism in Azad Kashmir
 Tourism in Gilgit-Baltistan
 Tourism in Karachi

References

External links 

Tourism Corporation of Khyber Pakhtunkhwa (TCKP)
Tourism in Khyber Pakhtunkhwa
Tourism in Khyber Pakhtunkhwa, PTDC